Chinese Panda coins are bullion coins issued by the People's Bank of China.

Issued first in 1982, Chinese panda coins have become the gold standard of the precious metal coins produced by the People's Republic of China. Produced in various sizes to satisfy demands from investors and collectors, the series continues to this day where the depiction on the coin changes with each new year.

 Chinese Silver Panda
 Chinese Gold Panda
 Chinese Palladium Panda

Coins of China